The men's singles of the 2002 Neridé Prague Indoor tournament was played on indoor hard courts in Průhonice, Czech Republic.

This was the third edition of the event.

Defending champion Ota Fukárek lost on first round.

Mario Ančić won in the final 6–1, 6–1 against Jérôme Golmard.

Seeds

Draw

Finals

Top half

Bottom half

References

External links
 Draws on ITF Site

2002 Singles